Joseph Robert Todd (born April 17, 1979) is a former American football Linebacker who played one game for the New York Jets in 2001. He was signed by the Tampa Bay Buccaneers in 2002 but did not make the roster. He was a high school football coach for the Milford Scarlet Hawks from 2013 to 2016.

References

New York Jets players
1979 births
American football linebackers
Hofstra Pride football players
Living people